Eduard Sandifort (November 14, 1742 – February 12, 1814) was a Dutch physician and anatomist.  He received his medical doctorate degree (Ph.D.) from Leiden University in 1763, and worked as a general practitioner in The Hague.  He was fluent in Dutch, German, Swedish, and Italian. He became a professor of anatomy and surgery in 1771 at Leiden University.  His most important writings are Observationes Anatomico-pathologicæ (1778), Excercitationes anatomicoacademicæ (1783–85), and the Museum Anatomicum Academiae Lugduno-Batavæ (1789–93), which was finished by his son, Gerard Sandifort (1779–1848).  Sandifort translated Nils Rosén von Rosenstein's Underrättelser om barn-sjukdomar och deras botemedel (The diseases of children, and their remedies) to Dutch in 1768. Sandifort was elected in 1768 as a foreign member of the Swedish Royal Academy of Sciences in Stockholm. In 1779 he was the first to document a case of carpal coalition.

References

1742 births
1814 deaths
Dutch anatomists
18th-century Dutch anatomists
Leiden University alumni
Academic staff of Leiden University
People from Dordrecht